The DuBois Area School District is a large, rural/suburban public school district located in central Pennsylvania. The district spans portions of two counties. In Clearfield County it covers the City of DuBois, the Boroughs of Falls Creek and Troutville and Bloom Township, Brady Township, Huston Township, Sandy Township and Union Township. In Jefferson County it covers the Boroughs of Falls Creek, Reynoldsville and Sykesville and Winslow Township. According to 2000 federal census data, it served a resident population of 32,200. By 2010, the district's population declined to 30,958 people. The educational attainment levels for the School District population (25 years old and over) were 89.9% high school graduates and 17.6% college graduates.

Schools
The district operates six public schools.

DuBois Area Senior High School (9-12)
DuBois Area Middle School (5-8)
C.G. Johnson Elementary School (K-4)
Juniata Elementary School (K-4)
Oklahoma Elementary School (K-4)
Wasson Avenue Elementary School (K-4)

High school students may choose to attend Jefferson County Dubois Area Vocational-Technical School for training in the construction and mechanical trades, the culinary arts and allied health careers. The Riverview Intermediate Unit IU6 provides the district with a wide variety of services like specialized education for disabled students and hearing, speech and visual disability services and professional development for staff and faculty.

Extracurriculars
Dubois Area School District offers a wide variety of clubs, activities and an extensive sports program.

Sports
The district funds:

Varsity

Boys
Baseball - AAAA
Basketball - AAAA
Cross Country - AAA
Football - AAAA
Golf - AAA
Rifle - AA
Soccer - AAA
Swimming and Diving - AAA
Tennis - AAA
Track and Field - AAA
Volleyball - AAA
Wrestling - AAA

Girls
Basketball - AAAA
Cheer - AAAA
Cross Country - AAA
Golf - AAA
Gymnastics - AAAA
Rifle - AAAA
Soccer (Fall) - AAA
Softball - AAAA
Swimming and Diving - AAA
Girls' Tennis - AAA
Track and Field - AAA
Volleyball - AAA

Middle School Sports

Boys
Basketball
Cross Country
Football
Soccer
Track and Field
Wrestling	

Girls
Basketball
Cross Country
Soccer (fall)
Softball 
Track and Field
Volleyball

According to PIAA directory July 2013

References

External links
 

School districts in Clearfield County, Pennsylvania
School districts in Jefferson County, Pennsylvania